Eilif Dahl (7 December 191617 March 1993) was a Norwegian botanist and politician for the Labour Party.

He was born in Kristiania. His interest in lichens started with an early friendship he developed with Professor Bernt Lynge. Thanks to Lynge, Dahl was able to take part in the 1936 Heimland botanical expedition to eastern Svalbard and Kong Karls Land, and then a Danish-Norwegian expedition to Greenland the next year. His collections from these excursions were used as part of his cand. real. thesis that he presented to the University of Oslo in 1942. According to Hildur Krog, his most important lichenological contribution was his 1950 work Studies in the Macrolichen Flora of SW Greenland, which was a revised version of his thesis.

Dahl was appointed professor of botany at the Norwegian College of Agriculture from 1965. His research interests centered on Arctic plants and lichen, plant geography and ecology. He was also a politician for the Labour Party, where he was a board member from 1965 to 1977. During the German occupation of Norway he took part in resistance work, and was a member of the clandestine intelligence organization XU. After fleeing to neutral Sweden and later to the United Kingdom, he served with the Norwegian High Command in London.

The lichen genus Eilifdahlia, and its type species, Eilifdahlia dahlii, are both named in his honour.

See also
 :Category:Taxa named by Eilif Dahl

References

1916 births
1993 deaths
Scientists from Oslo
Academic staff of the Norwegian College of Agriculture
Norwegian resistance members
Norwegian lichenologists
XU
Norwegian military personnel of World War II
Labour Party (Norway) politicians
20th-century Norwegian botanists
Politicians from Oslo
University of Oslo alumni